The Euplinthini form an accepted taxonomic tribe within the Elateridae (click beetle) subfamily Agrypninae.

Genera
Arcanelater Costa, 1975
Cleidecosta Johnson, 2002
Compsoplinthus Costa, 1975
Euplinthus Costa, 1975
Meroplinthus Candèze, 1891
Paraphileus Candèze, 1882
Pyrischius Hyslop, 1921

References

Elateridae